Kiran Kumar (born as Deepak Dhar; 20 October 1953 ) is an Indian screen and theatre actor. He has worked in numerous Hindi, Bhojpuri and Gujarati television and film productions. His latest work in drama is Charlie 2.

Personal life
Kumar comes from an aristocratic Kashmiri Pandit family; his great-grandfather was a nobleman who governed the Gilgit Agency as its Wazir-e-Wazarat.
He is son of veteran actor Jeevan

Career

Films
He attended Daly College, a boarding school in Indore, enrolled at R.D. National College in Bandra, Mumbai, and later joined the Film and Television Institute of India (FTII) in Pune. He was known as "Deepak Dhar" in Film and Television Institute of India among his friends. Kumar starred in Do Boond Pani in 1971 and went on to play the lead roles in several more movies. Kumar saw his career suffer with the release of movies like Jangal Mein Mangal, among others. Rakesh Roshan's Khudgarz got him back to Hindi cinema, in which negative roles in films like Tezaab and Khuda Gawah won him accolades as an antihero.

Television
One of his first television series was with Cinevistas (Sunil Mehta, Prem Kishen). He has since established himself as a Television star in the Television industry in series such as: Zindagi, Ghutan, Sahil,Manzil, Grihasti, Katha Sagar, Aur Phir ek Din, Papa, Miilee, Chhajje Chajje Ka Pyar and more.

Kiran was last seen on the silver screen in Dharma's Brothers, along with Akshay Kumar, Jackie Shroff and Siddharth Malhotra. Before that, he played Anees Khan in Born Free Production's Bobby Jasoos. Soham Shah's next release with Sanjay Dutt Sher, (This film is currently stuck in the cans due to Dutt's recent incarceration) also stars Kiran as the lead antagonist.

Filmography

Television 

 Aashiana - DD National
 Army - DD National
 Manzil - DD National
 Zindagi - DD National

Awards and nominations
 Filmfare Award for Best Performance in Negative Role (1992) (nominated for Khuda Gawah)
 Mayor's Award, for Ghutan
 Mayor's Award, for Aur Phir ek Din

References

External links
 
 Interview for IndianTelevision.cm
 Interview for Thaindian News
 Interview for tellychakkar.com
 Times of India interview

Indian male television actors
Indian male film actors
Male actors in Hindi cinema
Living people
Male actors from Indore
20th-century Indian male actors
21st-century Indian male actors
Male actors in Gujarati-language films
1935 births
The Daly College Alumni